The vertical volute spring suspension system is a type of vehicle suspension system. This type of the suspension system was mainly fitted on US and Italian tanks and armored fighting vehicles starting from throughout the 1930s up until after the end of the Second World War in 1945.

Development

During the 1930s, many innovations in the components of light tanks would make US tanks considerably more reliable. These included rubber-bushed tracks, rear mounted radial engines and the vertical volute spring suspension.

A volute spring is a compression spring in the form of a cone (a volute). Under compression the coils slide over each other, affording longer travel. The result is more stable and powerful than any leaf, coil, or torsion bar spring in the same volume. Mounted vertically in a road wheel bogie for a pair of road wheels on a tank made a very compact unit.

The Rock Island Arsenal produced a small tank for the cavalry which used vertical volute spring suspension instead of leaf spring suspension. Standardized as the M1 Combat Car, it entered service with the US Army in 1937. The design was used in the M2 light tank and subsequent Stuart tank series. Design features of the Stuart were scaled up for use in the first M2 medium tanks which would evolve into the more successful M3 Lee and M4 Sherman, all using the VVSS.

Replacement
Battle experience showed a relatively short life of the original vertical volute spring suspension (VVSS) of the late models M3s due to the tank's increasing combat weight with larger guns and larger tracks.  After mid-1944, M4A3 models of the Sherman adopted a newly developed Horizontal Volute Spring Suspension (HVSS).

Horizontal volute spring suspension 

This type of a suspension system involved springing the pair of dual-mounted road wheels on each bogie against each other with a volute-spring. It was essentially a version of the British Horstmann suspension that replaced the Horstmann's coil-spring with a pair of volute-springs.

When the horizontally-affixed volute-springs were placed in compression by either the front or the rear bogie wheel-arm, the pressure from the load was transmitted to the opposite arm, thus helping to keep tension maintained on the tracks. Compared to the VVSS system which it replaced on the US M4 Sherman tank, the HVSS system was heavier and stronger and allowed the changing of individual wheels aside from increasing wheel travel-space.

See also
Christie suspension
Horstmann suspension
Torsion bar suspension
Continuous track

Notes

Bibliography
 
 
 

 
Armoured fighting vehicle equipment
Tank suspensions
M4 Sherman tanks